Dapidodigma hymen, the western virgin, is a butterfly in the family Lycaenidae. It is found in Senegal, the Gambia, Guinea-Bissau, Guinea, Burkina Faso, Sierra Leone, Liberia, Ivory Coast, Ghana, Togo, Nigeria (south and the Cross River Loop) and western Cameroon. The habitat consists of forests and scrubland.

The larvae possibly feed on Alchornea species, a plant usually colonized by tailor ants of the genus Oecophylla.

References

External links
Die Gross-Schmetterlinge der Erde 13: Die Afrikanischen Tagfalter. Plate XIII 68 c

Butterflies described in 1775
Cheritrini
Taxa named by Johan Christian Fabricius